Kagumo High School is a boys national high school located between Kirichu and Kiganjo townships on the Nyeri-Nanyuki road in Kenya. The school was founded in 1933 as a primary institution in Gatitu, with the goal of developing trainable artisans for Native African training depots. In 1958, the school relocated to its current location in Kiganjo due to the generous land donation by Chief Wambugu wa Mathangani, whose legacy is celebrated in the schools Wambugu House. Over the years, Kagumo High School has grown significantly and developed a reputation for academic excellence. In 1946, it was one of the first schools in the country to allow Africans to sit for University Level Entrance Exams, and it became a national school in 2012 with a student population of 1200. Today, the school has 11 streams with a population of over 2,000 students. Kagumo High School has produced a number of notable alumni in various fields, including politics, law, business, and medicine.

Historical background 

Kagumo High School is a boys-only national school located in Kiganjo, Kenya. The school has a history that dates back to January 1933, when it was founded as a primary institution at Gatitu, with the goal of developing trainable artisans for the Native Industrial Training Depot at Kabete. The land on which the school was built was granted by the colonial government through the intervention of the Local Native Council in the late 1920s, and the first buildings were constructed by the well-known businessman and philanthropist Ernest Carr.

At the time, the school catered to the educational needs of African students, who were excluded from white schools. As demand for African education continued to grow, the school was converted into a normal primary school offering classes up to intermediate level. In 1944, a teacher training college, Kagumo Teachers Training College, was started alongside the primary school, with Alexander Gitau and Joseph Koinange as the first students. They did not have to go very far for their practical teaching as the primary school was in the same compound.

In 1949, the institution set up a secondary section, but the teacher training section remained. In 1951 Kagumo presented 18 students for the “O” Level examination, and they all passed for admission to Makerere University College.

The generous land donation by Chief Wambugu wa Mathangani in 1958 enabled the school to relocate to its current location in Kiganjo along the Nyeri- Nanyuki Road. The move took place in May 1960, under the leadership of Reverend Douglas Melhuish. Despite initial challenges such as inadequate housing and a lack of laboratories, Reverend Melhuish oversaw the construction of several key structures that are still in use today, including the Assembly Hall. The school is grateful to Chief Wambugu for his foresight and philanthropy, and it is in his name that Wambugu House is celebrated.

From a primary school with 96 students in 1933, it has developed into a National school with over 2000 students. The school has a reputation for academic excellence and has been a top choice for many students throughout its history. In 1946, it was one of the first schools in the country to allow native black Africans to sit for University Level Entrance Exams, and it became a national school in 2012 with a student population of 1200. Today, the school boasts 10 streams and a vibrant Old Boys Association that is involved in various projects at the institution.

It's worth mentioning that the construction of a branch railway line to Nanyuki was completed in 1931, opening up the Mount Kenya region. The railway allowed for rapid movement of goods, farm produce, livestock, and human traffic in and out of the region. This played a significant role in the development of the area and the establishment of the school.

Notable alumni

 Mutahi Kagwe
 James Mwangi

References 

Education in Central Province (Kenya)
High schools and secondary schools in Kenya